The 1969 Richmond Spiders football team was an American football team that represented the University of Richmond as a member of the Southern Conference (SoCon) during the 1969 NCAA University Division football season. In their fourth season under head coach Frank Jones, Richmond compiled a 6–4 record, with a mark of 5–1 in conference play, finishing as finishing as SoCon co-champion.

Schedule

References

Richmond
Richmond Spiders football seasons
Southern Conference football champion seasons
Richmond Spiders